Arresting God in Kathmandu is the debut book by Nepali-American author Samrat Upadhyay.   Published in 2001, Arresting God in Kathmandu was awarded the Whiting Writers' Award for fiction.  The book marks the first time a Nepali writer writing in English has been published in the West.

Synopsis 
It is a collection of nine short stories that provide a glimpse into everyday life in Kathmandu, Nepal. The stories included in the books are: 
 The Good Shopkeeper
 The Cooking Poet
 Deepak Misra's Secretary
 The Limping Bride
 During the Festival
 The Room Next Door
 The Man with Long Hair
 This World
 A Great Man's House

Reception
Publishers Weekly calls Upadhyay's writing "assured and simple", concluding that "Upadhyay anchors small yet potent epiphanies in a place called Kathmandu, and quietly calls it home."  On the other hand, Kirkus Reviews called the book a collection of "diverting if sometimes lukewarm tales."

References

2001 short story collections
Kathmandu

English books by Nepalese writer
Nepalese short story collections
Nepalese literature in English